

See also 
 United States House of Representatives elections, 1808 and 1809
 List of United States representatives from Kentucky

Notes 

1808
Kentucky
United States House of Representatives